A statue of Martin Luther King Jr. by Ed Dwight is installed in Denver's City Park, in the U.S. state of Colorado. The memorial was installed in 2002, replacing another statue of King which was relocated to Pueblo. The Denver statue also features depictions of Frederick Douglass, Mahatma Gandhi, Rosa Parks, and Sojourner Truth.

See also
 Civil rights movement in popular culture
 List of artistic depictions of Mahatma Gandhi

References

2002 establishments in Colorado
2002 sculptures
Cultural depictions of Frederick Douglass
Sculptures of Martin Luther King Jr.
Memorials to Martin Luther King Jr.
Memorials to Rosa Parks
Monuments and memorials in Colorado
Sculptures of men in Colorado
Sculptures of women in Colorado
Sojourner Truth
Statues in Colorado
Denver
Sculptures by Ed Dwight